Strejaci is a small settlement in the Municipality of Dornava in northeastern Slovenia. It lies in the foothills of the Slovene Hills on the left bank of the Pesnica River. The area is part of the traditional region of Styria. It is now included with the rest of the municipality in the Drava Statistical Region.

References

External links
Strejaci on Geopedia

Populated places in the Municipality of Dornava